Shadrino is a rural locality (a selo) and the administrative center of Shadrinsky Selsoviet of Kalmansky District, Altai Krai, Russia. The population was 659 as of 2016. There are nine streets.

Geography
Buranovo is the nearest rural locality.

Ethnicity
The village is inhabited by Russians and others.

References

Rural localities in Kalmansky District